Epeorus vitreus is a species of flatheaded mayfly in the family Heptageniidae. It is found in southeastern Canada and the eastern United States.

References

Further reading

External links

 

Mayflies
Insects described in 1853